Stephen Edward Williams (born January 7, 1956) is an American jazz drummer.

Discography 
As leader
 2006: New Incentive (Elabeth)

With Shirley Horn

 1985: The Garden of the Blues
 1987: All of Me
 1987: I Thought About You
 1988: Softly
 1989: Close Enough for Love
 1991: You Won't Forget Me
 1992: Here's to Life
 1993: Light Out of Darkness (A Tribute to Ray Charles)
 1994: I Love You, Paris
 1996: The Main Ingredient
 1997: Loving You
 1998: I Remember Miles
 2001: You're My Thrill
 2003: May the Music Never End
 2005: But Beautiful

With others
 1988: Code Violations – Gary Thomas
 1989: Masters from Different Worlds – Clifford Jordan and Ran Blake
 1989: In Good Company – Joe Williams
 1990: Sarah: Dedicated to You – Carmen McRae
 1991: For My Lady – Toots Thielemans
 1992: Glengarry Glen Ross (soundtrack) – Various
 1995: Ramona – Jeffery Smith
 1996: Monterey Jazz Festival – 40 Legendary Years – Various
 1997: Ballads from the Black Sea – Datevik
 1998: American Rhapsody – Vienna Art Orchestra
 1999: Trio+Strings – John Hicks
 2000: Sketches of James – Various
 2000: The Face of Love – Eugene Maslov
 2000: The Legacy Lives On – The Legacy Band
 2008: Wild Is Love – Jamie Broumas

References

External links 
 Official website

1956 births
Living people
African-American drummers
American jazz drummers
Musicians from Washington, D.C.
20th-century American drummers
American male drummers
20th-century American male musicians
American male jazz musicians
20th-century African-American musicians
21st-century African-American people